Wellington Katzor de Oliveira (born 4 September 1981), known as just Wellington, is a Brazilian retired footballer who played as a midfielder. He played for Avispa Fukuoka and Giravanz Kitakyushu of J2 League in Japan.

Honours
Santos
Campeonato Brasileiro Série A: 2002

Internacional
Campeonato Gaúcho: 2004, 2005

Hapoel Tel Aviv
Israel State Cup: 2006–07

América Mineiro
Campeonato Mineiro Módulo II: 2008

References

External links

  Profile and statistics of Wellington on One.co.il

1981 births
Living people
Brazilian footballers
Brazilian expatriate footballers
Santos FC players
Sport Club Internacional players
Hapoel Tel Aviv F.C. players
Avispa Fukuoka players
Giravanz Kitakyushu players
J2 League players
Expatriate footballers in Israel
Expatriate footballers in Japan
Brazilian people of German descent
Paulista Futebol Clube players
Red Bull Brasil players
Clube Atlético Juventus players
Expatriate footballers in Thailand

Association football midfielders